Upper Ten Thousand, or simply, The Upper Ten, is a 19th-century phrase referring to the wealthiest 10,000 residents of New York City. The phrase was coined in 1844 by American poet and author Nathaniel Parker Willis. Soon, the term came to be used to describe the upper circles not only of New York, but also those of other major cities.

Usages
In 1852, Charles Astor Bristed published a collection of sketches on New York Society entitled "The Upper Ten Thousand" in Fraser Magazine. In 1854, George Lippard serialized his book New York: Its Upper Ten and Lower Million. The phrase also appeared in British fiction in The Adventures of Philip (1861–62) by William Thackeray, whose eponymous hero contributed weekly to a fashionable New York journal entitled The Gazette of the Upper Ten Thousand. The general acceptance of the term seems to be attested by its use in the title of Edward Abbott's 1864 cookery book, The English and Australian Cookery Book: Cookery for the Many as Well as the "Upper Ten Thousand".

In 1875, both Adam Bissett Thom and Kelly's Directory published books entitled The Upper Ten Thousand, which listed members of the aristocracy, the gentry, officers in the British Army and Navy, members of Parliament, colonial administrators, and members of the Church of England. The usage of this term was a response to the broadening of the British ruling class which had been caused by the Industrial Revolution.

Most of the people listed in Kelly's Handbook to the Upper Ten Thousand were among the 30,000 descendants of Edward III, King of England, tabulated in the Marquis of Ruvigny and Raineval's Plantagenet Roll of the Blood Royal. Most also appeared in Walford's County Families and Burke's Landed Gentry.

Adolf Hitler referred to Franklin D. Roosevelt as being in the Upper Ten Thousand in his 1941 speech declaring war against the United States, while juxtaposing himself as "[sharing his] fate with millions of others."

See also
The Four Hundred (1892)
Upper class
We are the 99%

References

External links
Photographs and anecdotes of typical Upper Ten Thousand Victorians and Edwardians
Adam Bisset Thom, The Upper Ten Thousand (1875)

Social class in the United States
British biographical dictionaries
19th century in the United Kingdom
Social history of the United Kingdom
19th century in the United States
Social history of the United States
Oligarchy
High society (social class)
Upper class culture in New York City